Hawsawi is a famous and large Black Saudi family and may refer to: The original name gotten from hausa language which is the largest spoken language in west Africa 

Hamzah Hawsawi, Saudi Arabian singer and winner of season 4 of The X Factor Arabia
Mustafa al-Hawsawi (born 1968), member of al-Qaeda and allegedly an organizer and financer of the September 11 attacks
Osama Hawsawi (born 1984), Saudi Arabian football player
Omar Hawsawi (born 1985), Saudi Arabian football player
Etab (1947–2007), Saudi Arabian singer 
Motaz Hawsawi (born 1992), Saudi Arabian football player

Alaa Hawsawi (born 1992), Saudi Arabian Doctor and Businessman 

Arabic-language surnames